Riyana Sukla is an Indian actress who works in Odia, Hindi and Punjabi film industry. She is known for her portrayal in the Hindi movie Kaashi in Search of Ganga. She has also appeared in many Hindi, Odia and Punjabi films such as E Dil Tate Deli, Life Ki Aisi Ki Taisi, Mr MBA, Lucknowi Ishq.

Career
Sukla is from Cuttack, India. She had played a major role in the Bollywood film Life Ki Aisi Ki Taisi in 2017. She had played an important role in the Bollywood film Kaashi in Search of Ganga, where she played the role of a witness to a murderer. She also had played the lead roles in Lucknowi Ishq  Mr MBA and I Know You. She was the protagonist in the film E Dil Tate Deli where she played the role of a small town lady who had fallen in love with a boy who after resolving the family issues finally united. She also starred as a lead role in the web-series Fancy which was released on MX Player.

Filmography

Films

Web series

References

External links 
 

Living people
Indian film actresses
Actresses in Odia cinema
Year of birth missing (living people)